Phenylsilatrane is a convulsant chemical which has been used as a rodenticide.  Phenylsilatrane and some of its analogs with 4-substituents of H, CH3, Cl, Br, and CSi(CH3)3 are highly toxic to mice.  They have been observed in the laboratory to inhibit the 35S-tert-butylbicyclophosphorothionate (TBPS) binding site (GABA-gated chloride channel) of mouse brain membranes.

See also 
 Atrane
 GABAA receptor negative allosteric modulator
 GABAA receptor § Ligands
 Chlorophenylsilatrane

References 

Convulsants
Nitrogen heterocycles
Organosilicon compounds
Oxygen heterocycles
Rodenticides
Silicon heterocycles
GABAA receptor negative allosteric modulators
Phenyl compounds
Atranes